"I Can Help" is a song written and performed by Billy Swan. Released in July 1974, the song was a big crossover smash, reaching No. 1 on both the Billboard Hot 100 and Hot Country Singles charts late that fall. Although Swan had other charting singles on both the Hot 100 and country charts, the song is generally recognized as being Swan's only major hit single release. However, Swan had continued success as a songwriter for other artists and as a session musician.

Production
Billy Swan secured his own recording deal with Monument Records, after his return to Nashville in August 1973. From the time he secured the deal, Swan began the composition of "I Can Help" in a music room which his wife, Marlu, had converted from a closet inside the small duplex that they shared close to Centennial Park. Swan has revealed that he used a "Rock" preset, from his Rhythm Master drum machine, when writing the song; "It played 16ths and sounded like a sock cymbal, so I just started playing these chords along with it, and the song came in about 20 minutes. I didn't always write that quickly, but from my experience the ones that come quickly are the good ones. "Lover Please" was like that, and so was "Everything's the Same". With "I Can Help" I actually wrote the three verses first, and since I needed something to put between the second and third verse I then came up with the bridge. The whole thing just came out of the air, including the words."

"I Can Help" was written during March 1974, and also during that time Swan recorded it with producer and engineer Chip Young at the Young'un Sound studio in Murfreesboro. The distinctive keyboards were played by Swan on a portable Farfisa belonging to Memphis session musician Bobby Emmons while Young's German Shepherd puppy, Bowser, tugged on his pants leg. The vocals were recorded with a Neumann U47, while Swan's Farfisa, Mike Leech's bass and Reggie Young's guitar, were all recorded direct. Dennis Linde and Johnny Christopher, who performed for the song on acoustic guitars, were each miked with Sony ECM lapel mics, while the setup for Hayword Bishop's drums comprised another pair of ECMs overhead on the cymbals, an Electrovoice RE15 on the toms, an RE20 on the kick and a Shure SM58 on the snare. Keyboardist Bobby Wood was also booked for the session, but after hearing the track and realising he wasn't needed he joined Emmons and Young in the control room. Emmons and Young suggested overdubbing handclaps at the end to convey an in-studio party atmosphere, as well as adding some bridge-section backing vocals by Lea Jane Berinati and the Holliday Sisters. Swan recalls, "Chip was excited after he recorded that part, but I went out there and listened to it, and I said, 'Boy, I don't know.' I listened to it over and over, until finally I said, 'Hey, man, nothing else will work.' It was actually a great solo, so that just shows you where my head is at. That part was so perfect, and today a lot of people remember the song because of that solo."

The album version contains a false ending with the clapping followed by a reasonably extended cadenza on the organ, which then is followed by an instrumental repeat of the ending, followed by another brief organ cadenza, which afterwards is then followed by another instrumental repeat of the ending before the song's fade.

Release
Swan's version of "I Can Help" was released toward the end of July 1974. To make more money from the song's commercial success, the co-producers returned to Young'un Sound to record more material for an I Can Help album. This included covers of "Don't Be Cruel", "Shake, Rattle and Roll" and Swan's own "Lover Please".

However, the success of the song led the record company to argue about which would be the first single on the album. "Everyone at the record company had actually wanted 'The Ways of a Woman in Love' to be the first single," Young recalls. "I said, 'No, wait a minute. That's not the hit. The hit is "I Can Help".' However, [Monument Records president] Fred Foster then hired a guy who was supposed to know the ins and outs of the business, and he said, 'There aren't any hits here. We've gotta re-cut a bunch of stuff.' I said, 'No, we don't have to re-cut a bunch of stuff.' It was a battle from then on."

Chart performance
In addition to being a No. 1 country and pop hit, "I Can Help" reached No. 6 on Billboard'''s Hot Adult Contemporary Singles chart and No. 6 on the United Kingdom's Record Retailer'' chart. In addition, the song was a hit throughout most of Europe and also reached No. 1 in Australia. "I Can Help" was so successful in Norway that it charted for 37 weeks on the Norwegian charts (VG-lista Top 10), making it the 4th best-performing single of all time in that country.

"I Can Help" is certified gold for sales of 1,000,000 units by the Recording Industry Association of America. In U.K., it has "Silver" certification, and in France, it has sales about 700,000.

At the Amusement & Music Operators Association (AMOA) Jukebox Awards in 1975, the song was awarded "Jukebox Pop Record of the Year" for being the year's highest-earning pop music song played on jukebox machines in the United States.

Weekly singles charts

Year-end charts

Cover versions
Many other atrists have performed covers of the song, among them:
In 1975, Elvis Presley included it on his Today LP.
Loretta Lynn included it in 1975 on her, Back to the Country LP.
Tom Jones included the song on 1985's "Tender Loving Care" LP.
Ringo Starr
Shakin' Stevens included it on 1994's "The Singles Collection", which has released in Germany.

See also
List of 1970s one-hit wonders in the United States

References

External links
 

1974 debut singles
Billboard Hot 100 number-one singles
Cashbox number-one singles
Number-one singles in Australia
Number-one singles in New Zealand
Number-one singles in Germany
Billy Swan songs
Monument Records singles
1974 songs
Songs written by Billy Swan
Shakin' Stevens songs